Squamish may refer to:

Places
 Squamish, British Columbia, a district municipality in British Columbia, Canada
 Squamish-Lillooet Regional District, British Columbia, Canada
 Squamish River, a river in British Columbia, Canada, named after the Squamish people

People
 Squamish people, a Northwest Coast indigenous people, in their language "Sḵwx̱wú7mesh", after whom the river is named (the town of Squamish is named for the river)
 Squamish language, the language of the Squamish people
 Squamish Nation, the band government of the Squamish people

Other
 43-Man Squamish, a fictional sport featured in Mad Magazine
 Squamish Five, a militant activist group, named as such by the media because they were arrested near Squamish, British Columbia
 Squamish (wind), a type of wind in coastal British Columbia

Language and nationality disambiguation pages